Wolves Among Sheep is a music DVD released by Bleeding Through on November 15, 2005 through Trustkill Records. It features live footage, backstage footage from various concerts. The video has a running time of approx. 5 hours (2 hours documentary and 3 hours bonus footage). AFI vocalist Davey Havok makes an appearance on the DVD doing guest vocals for a couple songs.

Track listing

Documentary
 "Introduction"
 "Welcome to The OC, Bitch" 
 "Wolves Among Sheep"
 "The Path To The Truth"   
 "Exposing The Truth"
 "The Truth"

Bonus material
 "Deleted Scenes"
 "Live at Soma (July 2005)"  
 "The "Live" Archive"
 "The "Tour" Archive"
 ""Love Lost" Music Video"

Credits
Directed by Ryan Downey
Edited by David Brundy and Ryan Downey
Artwork by Rob Dobi
Photographs by Jeremy Saffer and Greg Straight Edge

Bleeding Through video albums
2005 live albums
2005 video albums
Live video albums